The Ottoman-Turkish journal Nahid was published in Istanbul in 1886, and 1887 in a total of 28 issues. Its content focused largely on literary topics, as well as articles on art and culture of that time.

References

1886 establishments in the Ottoman Empire
1887 disestablishments in the Ottoman Empire
Defunct magazines published in Turkey
Magazines established in 1886
Magazines disestablished in 1887
Magazines published in Istanbul
Cultural magazines published in Turkey
Turkish-language magazines
Literary magazines published in Turkey